The 2018–19 Seton Hall Pirates women's basketball team represented Seton Hall University during the 2018–19 NCAA Division I women's basketball season. The Pirates, led by sixth year head coach Anthony Bozzella, played their home games in South Orange, New Jersey at the Walsh Gymnasium as members of the Big East Conference. They finished the season 15–16, 7–11 in Big East play to finish in a tie for eighth place. They lost in the first round of the Big East women's tournament to St. John's. They received an at-large bid to the WNIT where they lost to Toledo in the first round.

Roster

Schedule

|-
!colspan=9 style=| Exhibition

|-
!colspan=9 style=| Non-conference regular season

|-
!colspan=9 style=| Big East regular season

|-
!colspan=9 style=| Big East Women's Tournament

|-
!colspan=9 style=| WNIT

See also
 2018–19 Seton Hall Pirates men's basketball team

References

Seton Hall
Seton Hall Pirates women's basketball seasons
Seton Hall